Snowblind: A brief career in the cocaine trade written by American author Robert Sabbag in 1976 is a non-fiction account about a character named Zachary Swan who turned his hand to smuggling cocaine from Colombia into the US. Set in the 1970s before organised crime took over the cocaine trade, it is based primarily in New York City and Bogotá and features a variety of colourful characters. Unlike other smugglers at the time Swan concocted a vast array of scams designed both to evade customs officials and protect his 'employees' from prosecution, all of which are highly imaginative and entertaining.

Trivia

 Howard Marks wrote an introduction for the UK 1998 Canongate reprint.
Damien Hirst designed a repackaged version limited to 1000 copies with sleeve, reinforced mirror hard backed cover, imitation credit card, (in the name of Zacharie Swan), and a rolled up $100 bill hidden in a cut away trench in the middle of the book. All three conspirators, Sabbag, Marks and Hirst hand signed all 1000.

1976 American novels
American autobiographical novels
Smuggling
Novels set in Colombia
Novels set in New York City
Non-fiction books about Colombian drug cartels
Cocaine in the United States
Colombia–United States relations
Books about cocaine
Bobbs-Merrill Company books
Works about smuggling